Mustapha Ishak-Boushaki is a theoretical physicist, cosmologist and professor at the University of Texas at Dallas. He is known for his contributions to the studies of cosmic acceleration and dark energy, gravitational lensing, and testing alternatives to general relativity; as well as his authorship of Testing General Relativity in Cosmology, a review article published in Living Reviews in Relativity. He was elected in 2021 as Fellow of American Association for the Advancement of Science (AAAS) with the quote: "For distinguished contributions to the field of theoretical cosmology, particularly for testing modifications to general relativity at cosmological scales, and for sustained excellence in teaching and mentoring of students."

Education and academic background 
Mustapha Ishak-Boushaki was born in Algeria, where he grew up and completed his pre-university studies in the city of Bouira. He moved to Montreal in 1987. In 1994, he received his undergraduate degree in computer science at the University of Quebec at Montreal, followed by an additional undergraduate degree in physics from the University of Montreal in 1998. He then attended Queen's University at Kingston where in 2003 he completed his PhD in general relativity and theoretical cosmology.
 
His graduate work included studied on inhomogeneous cosmologies, wormholes, exact solutions in general relativity of compact objects (such as neutron stars), and an inverse approach to the Einstein field equations.
 
Following the completion of his graduate studies, Ishak-Boushaki began work as a research associate at Princeton University until later entering a professorship at the University of Texas at Dallas in 2005. While at the University of Texas at Dallas, he formed an active group of cosmologists and astrophysicists, and was received the Outstanding Teacher of the Year Award in the years 2007 and 2018, as well as the University President's Excellence in Teaching Award   He is an active member of the Dark Energy Science Collaboration: a collaboration of the Legacy Survey of Space and Time, as well as the Dark Energy Spectroscopic Instrument, both dedicated to constraining the properties of cosmic acceleration and dark energy, as well as testing the nature of gravity at cosmic scales.

Research and career 
Mustapha Ishak-Boushaki's work involves research in the subjects of the origin and cause of cosmic acceleration and the dark energy associated with it, testing general relativity at cosmological scales, the application of gravitational lensing to cosmology, intrinsic alignment of galaxies, and inhomogeneous cosmological models.
 
In 2005, Ishak-Boushaki and collaborators proposed a procedure to distinguish between dark energy and modification to general relativity at cosmological scales as a cause of cosmic acceleration. The idea was based on the fact that cosmic acceleration affects both the expansion rate and the growth rate of large-scale structures in the universe. These two effects must be consistent one with another since they are based on the same underlying theory of gravity. The publication was one of the first to: (1) contrast dark energy versus modified gravity as cause of cosmic acceleration, (2) use inconsistencies between cosmological parameters to test gravitational theory at cosmological scales. He and collaborators wrote then a series of publications on testing general relativity at cosmological scales and his work on the subject was recognized by an invitation to write in 2018 a review article on the current state of research in the field of testing general relativity in the journal Living Reviews in Relativity. Ishak-Boushaki and collaborators made a first detection of the large-scale intrinsic alignment of galaxies of type "intrinsic shear – gravitational shear" using a spectroscopic galaxy sample from the Sloan Digital Sky Survey. He and collaborators also made a first detection of these intrinsic alignments using a self-calibration method in the photometric galaxy sample in Kilo-Degree Survey. Ishak-Boushaki and collaborator wrote a review article on the intrinsic alignment of galaxies and its impact on weak gravitational lensing. Ishak-Boushaki and a collaborator proposed a new mathematical measure of inconsistency between cosmological datasets called the index of inconsistency (IOI) as well as a novel Baysian interpretation of the level of significance of such measures.

Awards and honors

References

External links 

Mustapha Ishak-Boushaki's personal website
Mustapha Ishak-Boushaki's papers recorded in INSPIRE-HEP

Kabyle people
American astrophysicists
American cosmologists
Algerian astrophysicists
21st-century American physicists
1967 births
Living people
Theoretical physicists
Algerian emigrants to Canada
Algerian expatriates in the United States
Université du Québec à Montréal alumni
Université de Montréal alumni
Queen's University at Kingston alumni
Princeton University alumni
Princeton University faculty
University of Texas at Dallas faculty
20th-century Algerian physicists
21st-century Algerian physicists
Algerian science writers
Mustapha
Naturalized citizens of the United States
21st-century Algerian inventors
Fellows of the American Physical Society